Pol Calvo Sánchez, known artistically as Pol Calvo (Spanish pronunciation: [ˈpol ˈkalβo]; Barcelona, Spain, 4 August 2006) is a Spanish singer and songwriter. He first rose to fame in Spain and Latin America in 2022 after having won the seventh season of La Voz Kids, as part of Team Pablo.

He won a contract with Universal Music, releasing his first single called "Tu Madrid" on 27 October 2022 (UTC).

On 12 January 2023 at 14:00 UTC, Calvo revealed on social networks a self-authored unpublished song, titled "No fue suficiente" ("It was not enough"), in advance for his first album.

Biography 
Calvo was born in Barcelona, Spain, 4 August 2006. He started singing alone to songs by Malú, discovering its own talent and taste. He has been interested about music and practicing singing in front of an audience since he was 4 years old.

La Voz Kids 
Calvo attempted first time to enter the contest in 2016. While he passed the first video casting, he was eliminated in the selection process.

He tried again in 2021 (Season 7, aired in 2022), this time successfully accessing the Blind auditions phase, which counted with the coaches David Bisbal, Sebastián Yatra, Aitana and Pablo López.

Calvo defaulted to Pablo López's team, as he was the only coach to turn his chair at the end of the performance. Calvo went on to win the competition on 22 July 2022.

Artistry

Influences 
Calvo is influenced by international ballad and pop music and inspired by Aitana, Whitney Houston, Celine Dion, Ariana Grande and Morat.

Personal life 
Calvo lives with his parents and older sister near Barcelona, and none of his relatives has been linked with professional musical activity in the past.

Calvo likes dogs and owns one named "Lana". He has also stated to have claustrophobia.

Discography

Singles 

"Tu Madrid" ("Your Madrid") is the first single by Spanish singer Pol Calvo. It was released on 27 October 2022 (UTC).

Background 
The song is a romantic ballad, with hints of pop/rock. It is written in 2nd person. Calvo sings about his yearning of recovering a broken relationship, by traveling to Madrid via train to spend time together, so she can show "Her Madrid" to him.

Music Video 
The video shows Calvo traveling through several Madrid locations, sometimes inside a car, sometimes walking, while singing and sentimentally dancing the song. Some scenes show him writing a few lines to the girl he would meet while others show him dressing up for the occasion. By the end, Calvo appears intensely singing the last notes in a background illuminated dark studio or concert hall before an abrupt ending into silence over Calvo's gaze, giving pass to the credits impressed on a view of the city of Madrid at dusk.

Live Performances and Concerts 
On 3 December 2022, at Llinars del Vallès, Pol Calvo performed live for the first time after rising to fame. It was a rendition to the Gospel song "For Your Glory" of the album Grace by Tasha Cobbs.

On 17 December 2022, at about 1:00 am local time in Madrid (midnight UTC), Pol Calvo gave a surprise live performance at the national TV, together with current winners of La Voz (both Adult and Senior), of the song "La Mejor Noche de mi Vida", from the Album "Once Historias y un Piano", by their former coach Pablo López.

On 23 December 2022, Pol Calvo performed live for the first time in a classical theater, at the Palau de la Música -a UNESCO World Heritage Site- in Barcelona, Spain. This was also the first time that he was accompanied by a Classical Music Orchestra.

References 

The Voice Kids contestants
Spanish child singers
2006 births
Living people